Leon Davis may refer to:

Leon J. Davis (1906–1992), Polish-born labor leader
Leon S. Davis, American politician in Oregon
Leon Davis (footballer), Australian rules footballer
Leon Davis (actor), British-born actor
Leon Davis Jr., American spree killer

See also
Liam Davis (disambiguation)